The Austmannali Tunnel is a road tunnel in Ullensvang Municipality in Vestland county, Norway. The tunnel was built in 1982 to replace a steep section of the highway that was built in 1880 which had a road grade of 8.3% and included five sharp hairpin turns. The new tunnel is wider than the old road and it is one large horseshoe curve with a steady increase in elevation through the whole tunnel.

The concrete structure supporting the entrance was completely destroyed.

References

Ullensvang
Road tunnels in Vestland